Frederick F. Woerner Jr. (born August 12, 1933) is a retired four-star general of the United States Army, former Commander-in-Chief of United States Southern Command, former Chairman of the American Battle Monuments Commission, and Professor Emeritus of Boston University.

Education
 1955: U.S. Military Academy – Bachelor of Science degree
 1959: Defense Language Institute
 1964: U.S. Army Command and General Staff College
 1965: University of Arizona – Master of Arts degree in Latin American History
 1969: Uruguayan Military Institute of Superior Studies
 1973: U.S. Army War College

Military career
Woerner was a commissioned officer in the United States Army from 1955 to 1989. He graduated from the United States Military Academy, West Point, New York and was commissioned second lieutenant of Infantry. He qualified as a parachutist and as a Ranger.

Woerner pursued a military career divided between traditional infantry assignments and duties associated with Latin America. He commanded infantry units at platoon, company, battalion, and brigade levels and served on staffs at every echelon up through the United States Army General Staff.

Woerner spent a year in study and travel in the northern countries of South America. He advised the Guatemalan government on the use of military forces in socio-economic development, attended the Uruguayan Military Institute of Superior Studies, served as director of Latin American studies at the U.S. Army War College. He served as the commanding general of the United States Sixth Army from 1986 through 1987, responsible for the readiness for mobilization of all Army National Guard forces and U.S. Army Reserve units in the twelve western states. His final position was as commander-in-chief of U.S. Southern Command from 1987 through 1989, responsible for mission performance, training, and welfare of all Department of the Army personnel in Central America, Panama, and South America. In that position he was the senior U.S. military officer responsible for strategy development and military policy execution in support of U.S. national objectives in Central America, Panama, and South America. He provided leadership to an organization consisting of over 30,000 military and civilian employees, located in 17 countries, and provided for the well being of the employees and their 40,000 family members.  After President George H. W. Bush took office, he removed Woerner for being too sympathetic towards Manuel Noriega's military regime in Panama, which the Bush administration was planning to invade. He retired as a general.

Civilian employment
From 1990 to 2003 Woerner was a Professor of International Relations at Boston University. He was a tenured full professor teaching in the Department of International Relations, College of Arts and Sciences. He taught courses addressing United States national security and Latin America.

Woerner served as senior executive for the completion of the project to build the congressionally mandated World War II Memorial on the National Mall in Washington, DC, including design, private fund raising, construction, and dedication. He was also responsible for commemorating the services of the armed forces through the management of 24 military burial grounds and 28 monuments/markers located worldwide, and the construction of new memorials.

Awards and decorations
Woerner's awards and decorations include: Defense Distinguished Service Medal, Army Distinguished Service Medal with one Oak Leaf Cluster, Legion of Merit with two Oak Leaf Clusters, Bronze Star Medal with one Oak Leaf Cluster, Meritorious Service Medal, Air Medal, Army Commendation Medal, National Defense Service Medal with one Oak Leaf Cluster, Armed Forces Expeditionary Medal, Army Service Ribbon with numeral five, Vietnam Service Medal with four Bronze Stars, Argentine Order of May of Military Merit (Grand Officer Grade), El Salvadoran Gold Medal for Merit, El Salvadoran Gold Medal for Distinguished Service, Guatemalan Cross of Military Merit First Class, Honduran Armed Forces Cross, Panamanian Distinguished Service Medal, Venezuelan Star of Carabobo, Vietnam Cross of Gallantry with Gold Star, U.S. Combat Infantryman Badge, Master Parachutist Badge, Ranger Tab, Army General Staff Badge, Ecuadorian Parachutist Badge, Guatemalan Parachutist Badge, Honduran Parachutist Badge, Panamanian Parachutist Badge, Paraguayan Parachutist Badge, and Uruguayan General Staff Badge.

Post-retirement activities and recognitions
 Member of the Council on Foreign Relations
 Associate of the Inter-American Dialogue
 Distinguished Fellow of the U.S. Army War College
 Award of Merit, The Penn Charter Alumni Society
 Order of Saint Maurice, Rank of Primicerius, (National Infantryman’s Association)

References

United States Army generals
United States Military Academy alumni
United States Army personnel of the Vietnam War
Recipients of the Legion of Merit
University of Arizona alumni
Military personnel from Philadelphia
1933 births
Living people
William Penn Charter School alumni
Boston University faculty